The 2018 Iowa Barnstormers season was the team's eighteenth season as a professional indoor football franchise and fourth in the Indoor Football League (IFL). They were one of six teams that competed in the IFL for the 2018 season. The Barnstormers were members of the United Conference in previous seasons, but due to the loss of several teams in the offseason, there was no conference alignment for the 2018 season.

Led by second-year head coach Dixie Wooten, the Barnstormers played their home games at the Wells Fargo Arena in the Des Moines, Iowa. On July 7, 2018, the Barnstormers won the United Bowl, the first championship in the club's history.

Standings

Staff

Schedule
Key:

Regular season
All start times are local.

Postseason

Roster

References

Iowa Barnstormers seasons
2018 Indoor Football League season
United Bowl champion seasons